Shop on TV was a home shopping television channel, broadcast in the United Kingdom and Ireland on the Sky platform.

Shop on TV claimed to appeal to regular viewers and purchasers from other shopping channels. However, unlike most other UK shopping channels, there were no live or interactive broadcasts shown on Shop on TV. All content on the channel was made up of pre-recorded infomercials that were between 15 and 30 minutes. The channel broadcast 24 hours a day, 7 days a week.

On 10 September 2009, Shop on TV was removed from the Freesat platform, where it had been on channel 807.

On 10 March 2011, it was announced that Shop on TV's Sky EPG slot on channel 659 had been sold to Pavers Shoes who would launch their own channel (PaversShoes.tv) on 6 April. Shop on TV would therefore close.

References

External links
 Shop on TV homepage

Shopping networks in the United Kingdom
Infomercials
Defunct television channels in the United Kingdom
Television channels and stations disestablished in 2011
Television channels and stations established in 2009